Lord Clyde may refer to

 Field Marshal Colin Campbell, 1st Baron Clyde (1792–1863), Scottish soldier
 James Avon Clyde, Lord Clyde (1863–1944), Scottish Conservative politician and judge
 James Latham Clyde, Lord Clyde (1898–1975), Scottish Unionist politician and judge
 James John Clyde, Baron Clyde (1932–2009), Scottish judge in the House of Lords
 , a steamer built on the Clyde in 1862, sold as a blockade runner as Advance, and later in the US Navy
 HMS Lord Clyde (1864), a class of steam ironclad warships of the Royal Navy
 Lord Clyde-class ironclad, a class of steam ironclad warships of the Royal Navy named after HMS Lord Clyde